The 2011 Copa de la Reina was the 29th edition of the competition. It comprised two double-leg stages and a final four that took place in La Ciudad del Fútbol in Las Rozas de Madrid. It was won by FC Barcelona, their second title.

Qualified teams

Results

First round

|}

Quarter-finals

|}

Final Four

Semifinal

Final

References

Copa de la Reina
Women
2010-11